was a Japanese actress.   In 1858, she became the first woman actor in the kabuki theatre since the ban on female actors in 1629, and thus the acting profession was reintroduced for women in Japan. She was followed as a pioneer actress by Kawakami Sadayakko (1872–1946), who in 1903 became the first Japanese actress within modern Western drama.

References

1846 births
1913 deaths
19th-century Japanese actresses